Henry Giles (1809–1882) was a minister and writer.

Henry Giles may also refer to:

Henry Gyles (1640–1709), or Giles (1640?–1709), English glass painter

See also
 Giles (surname)
 Harry Giles (disambiguation)